Spathiphyllum montanum is a flowering plant of the genus Spathiphyllum in the family Araceae. It is native to Panama and Costa Rica.

References

External links

montanum
Flora of Panama
Flora of Costa Rica
Plants described in 1976